Dark Room is the fourth studio album by Australian band The Angels, released in June 1980. It was their first album for CBS/Epic and was co-produced by the group's John and Richard Brewster (brothers). It peaked at number five on the Kent Music Report Albums Chart. It reached number 37 on the New Zealand Albums Chart in July 1980.

In the Australasian market the album provided three singles, "No Secrets", "Poor Baby" and "Face the Day". "No Secrets" peaked at No. 8 on the Kent Music Report Singles Chart – their highest position to that time. The other two reached the top 100 in Australia. "Face the Day" appeared at No. 30 on the New Zealand Singles Chart.

For European and North American markets the album was issued as Darkroom in October 1980 under the name, Angel City, "to avoid confusion with the US glam metal band Angel." Two tracks, "Alexander" and "I'm Scared", were replaced by "Ivory Stairs" and "Straight Jacket". When the group toured the United States to promote this album they performed as Angel City. They released "No Secrets" as Angel City, late in 1980.

In June 2002 Shock Records issued four-disc box set The Complete Sessions 1980–1983 with remastered versions of Dark Room (nine bonus tracks), Night Attack (nine bonus tracks), Watch the Red (five bonus tracks) and The Blow (2× CD). In June 2006 Liberation Music re-issued Dark Room using the version from The Complete Sessions 1980–1983.

Reception

Track listings
Dark Room (June 1980) CBS/Epic (EPC 451066 2)

Personnel
The Angels
 Doc Neeson – lead vocals
 Rick Brewster – lead guitar, piano, organ
 John Brewster – rhythm guitar, backing vocals
 Chris Bailey – bass guitar, backing vocals
 Graham "Buzz" Bidstrup – drums

Recording details
 Producer – Graham Bidstrup (track 1), J. Brewster (tracks 2–9), R. Brewster (tracks 2–9)
 Audio engineer – Dave Marett, Dave Cafe, Mark Opitz

Art works
 Cover – Timewinds
 Photography – Shoot and Run

Charts

Certifications and sales

References

External links
 
 Dark Room at Liberation Music

The Angels (Australian band) albums
1980 albums
Epic Records albums